Espinosa or Espinoza is a Spanish and Portuguese surname.

Notable people with the surname include:

People

Espinosa
 Abe Espinosa (1889–1980), American golfer
 Al Espinosa (1891–1957), American golfer
 Albert Espinosa (born 1973), Spanish writer and actor
 Alonso de Espinosa (born 1543), Spanish priest and historian
 Andrés Espinosa (born 1963), Mexican runner
 Angel Espinosa (1966–2017), Cuban boxer
 Ángela María Espinosa (born 1974), Colombian fencer
 Antonio Castejón Espinosa (1896–1969), Spanish army officer
 Antonio Vázquez de Espinosa (died 1630), Spanish friar
 Aurelio Macedonio Espinosa Jr. (1907–2004), American academic
 Aurelio Macedonio Espinosa Sr. (1880–1958), American academic
 Bernardo Espinosa (born 1989), Colombian footballer
 Bobby Espinosa (1949–2010), American musician
 Carlos Espinosa (born 1982), Chilean footballer
 Carmen E. Espinosa, American judge
 Carolina Espinosa, Ecuadorian equestrian
 Celedonio Espinosa, Filipino boxer
 Chris Espinosa (born 1961), senior employee of Apple Inc
 Daniel Espinosa (born 1977), Swedish film director
 Daniela Espinosa (born 1999), Mexican footballer
 Danny Espinosa (born 1987), American baseball player
 Eden Espinosa (born 1978), American singer and stage actress
 Edouard Espinosa (1871–1950), British dancer
 Eliécer Espinosa (born 1996), Colombian footballer
 Emmanuel Espinosa (born 1975), Mexican musician
 Erik Espinosa (born 1980), Mexican footballer
 Esteban Espinosa (born 1962), Ecuadorian cyclist
 Esteban Robles Espinosa (died 2008), Mexican police officer
 Eugenio de Espinosa, Spanish soldier
 Fabio Espinosa (born 1948), Colombian footballer
 Facundo Espinosa (born 1980), Argentine actor
 Felipe Espinosa (c. 1826–1863), Mexican-American murderer
 Fermin Espinosa (born 1940), Cuban boxer
 Francisco Espinosa (disambiguation), multiple people
 Gabriel Espinosa (born 1985), Ecuadorian footballer
 Gabriel de Espinosa (died 1595), Spanish criminal
 Gabriel Arellano Espinosa, Mexican politician
 Gaspar de Espinosa (1484–1537), Spanish explorer and politician
 Helena Espinosa Berea (ca. 1895 – ca. 1960), Mexican academic
 Hernán Espinosa (1916–1991), Spanish equestrian
 Isidro de Espinosa (1697–1755), Spanish missionary
 Jerónimo Jacinto de Espinosa (1600–1667), Spanish painter
 Jesús María Espinosa (1908–1995), Colombian painter
 Jordan Espinosa (born 1989), American mixed martial artist
 José Miguel Espinosa (born 1945), Spanish swimmer
 José Roberto Espinosa (1948–2007), Mexican sports commentator
 Juan Bautista de Espinosa (1590–1641), Spanish painter
 Juan de Espinosa, Spanish painter
 Juan de Espinosa Medrano (ca. 1629–1688), Peruvian cleric
 Juan Javier Espinosa (1815–1870), Ecuadorian politician
 Juan Pablo Espinosa (born 1980), Colombian actor
 Júlio Espinosa (born 1951), Brazilian football manager
 Julio García Espinosa (1926–2016), Cuban film director
 Léon Espinosa (1825–1903), Dutch dancer
 Leonor Espinosa, Colombian chef
 Lisandra Espinosa (born 1986), Cuban handball player
 Lodovico Espinosa (1926–2006), Filipino sports shooter
 Luis Espinosa (born 1967), Colombian cyclist
 Luisito Espinosa (born 1967), Filipino boxer
 Manrique Espinosa (born 2002), Bolivian footballer
 Manuel Espinosa (1912–2006), Argentine painter
 Maria Espinosa (born 1939), American author
 María Fernanda Espinosa (born 1964), Ecuadorian politician and diplomat
 Mariana Espinosa (born 1984), Ecuadorian footballer
 Marianne Espinosa, American judge
 Mariel Espinosa (born 1987), Mexican athlete
 Maricet Espinosa (born 1990), Cuban judoka
 Mason Espinosa, American football player
 Mauricio Espinosa (born 1972), Uruguayan football referee
 Mayte Espinosa, Spanish athlete
 Michel Espinosa (born 1993), French-Cameroonian footballer
 Neri Espinosa (born 1986), Argentine footballer
 Nicolás Pacheco Espinosa (born 1994), Peruvian sport shooter
 Nino Espinosa (1959–1987), Dominican baseball player
 Omar Espinosa, American musician
 Oscar Espinosa (disambiguation), multiple people
 Pablo Espinosa (born 1992), Spanish actor and musician
 Paola Espinosa (born 1985), Mexican diver
 Patricia Espinosa (born 1958), Mexican politician and diplomat
 Paul Espinosa, American politician
 Renato Espinosa (born 1998), Peruvian footballer
 Randy Espinosa (born 1988), Guamanian footballer
 Rebeca Espinosa (born 1992), Panamanian footballer
 Roberto Espinosa (born 1959), Cuban footballer 
 Rod Espinosa, Filipino comic book writer and artist 
 Rolando Espinosa (1950–2016), Filipino politician and convicted criminal
 Rubén Espinosa (1983–2015), Mexican photographer and journalist
 Salvador Espinosa (born 1956), Mexican filmmaker
 Sid Espinosa (born 1972), American businessman and politician
 Sílvia Soler Espinosa (born 1987), Spanish tennis player
 Sofía Espinosa (born 1989), Mexican actress and director
 Sonsoles Espinosa (born 1961), Spanish musician
 Valdir Espinosa (1947–2020), Brazilian football manager
 Veronica Espinosa, Ecuadorian doctor 
 Yaniuska Espinosa (born 1986), Venezuelan weightlifter
 Yusnelvis Espinosa (born 2000), Cuban footballer
 Yvette Espinosa (1911–1992), English ballerina

Espinoza
 Álvaro Espinoza (born 1962), Venezuelan baseball player
 Anagabriela Espinoza (born 1988), Mexican model and beauty queen
 Anderson Espinoza (born 1998), Venezuelan baseball player
 Fernando Espinoza (disambiguation), multiple people
 Giovanny Espinoza (born 1977), Ecuadorian footballer
 José Ángel Espinoza (1919–2015), Mexican musician and actor
 Joshua Jennifer Espinoza (born 1987), American poet
 Nicolás Espinoza (1795–1845), Salvadoran general
 Plácida Espinoza (born 1948) Bolivian politician
 Roger Espinoza (born 1986), Honduran footballer
 Rubén Espinoza (born 1961), Chilean footballer

Fictional characters
 Angelo Espinosa, also known as Skin, Marvel Comics character
 Anna Espinosa, character in Alias.
 Carla Espinosa, character in Scrubs.
 Julio Espinosa, character from Gran Hotel Spanish television series.
Oscar Espinosa, character from video game Just Cause 4.
 Rosita Espinosa, character from The Walking Dead franchise.
 Daniel “Dan” Espinoza, character from Lucifer (TV Series)

References

Spanish-language surnames